The Cyclopean Wall of Rajgir is a  long wall of stone which encircled the ancient city of Rajgriha (present-day Rajgir), in the Indian state of Bihar, to protect it from external enemies and invaders. It is among the oldest examples of cyclopean masonry in the world.

History
It was erected by the rulers of the Brihadratha (rawani) Dynasty using massive undressed stones. The walls are also mentioned in Buddhist works.

Condition
Only some portions of it remain. Most of the original structure has disappeared with time. The wall is currently designated as a national monument, and the Bihar Archaeological Department has recommended to the Archaeological Survey of India that it should be included in the list of UNESCO World Heritage Sites, which was achieved in 1987.

Characteristics
The wall is a type of stonework built with massive limestone boulders, roughly filled together with minimal clearance between adjacent stones and no use of mortar. The boulders typically seem unworked, but some may have been shaped with a hammer.

References

City walls in India
Archaeological sites in Bihar
Rajgir